A Touch of the Blues may refer to:

 A Touch of the Blues (Mal Waldron album), 1972
 A Touch of the Blues (Long John Baldry album), 1989